Two (post-1964) highways in the U.S. state of California have been designated Route 117:
California State Route 117 (1964-1965), Junipero Serra Boulevard in the San Francisco Bay Area
California State Route 117 (1972-1986), Otay Mesa Road near San Diego (now SR 905)